Karl Sune Wehlin (12 January 1923 – 21 September 2020) was a Swedish modern pentathlete. He competed at the 1948 Summer Olympics.

References

External links
 

1923 births
2020 deaths
Swedish male modern pentathletes
Olympic modern pentathletes of Sweden
Modern pentathletes at the 1948 Summer Olympics
Sportspeople from Stockholm